The U.S. Post Office-Springville Main at 309 South Main Street in Springville, Utah, United States was built in 1941. It was built in Colonial Revival style and credited to supervising architect Louis A. Simon. It has also been known as Springville Main Post Office. It was listed on the National Register of Historic Places in 1989.

See also

 National Register of Historic Places listings in Utah County, Utah

References

External links

Government buildings completed in 1941
Post office buildings on the National Register of Historic Places in Utah
Colonial Revival architecture in Utah
Buildings and structures in Springville, Utah
National Register of Historic Places in Utah County, Utah
Individually listed contributing properties to historic districts on the National Register in Utah